The Seattle Republican was a weekly newspaper in Seattle from 1894 to 1913, and is considered Seattle's first successful newspaper for African Americans. Its founder, was a former slave in the American South. Clayton's wife, Susie Revels Cayton, was associate editor starting in 1900 and she contributed articles and short stories. The newspaper sought to portray "the black race" in a positive manner and hoped to create harmony between races through open discussion of sensitive race issues. This upset white readership and likely contributed to the newspaper's closing. The newspaper is part of the collection of the Library of Congress.

References 

African-American history in Seattle
Defunct African-American newspapers
Defunct newspapers published in Washington (state)
Newspapers published in Seattle
Publications established in 1894
Publications disestablished in 1917